Khalid Mehmood Soomro (7 May 1959 to 29 November 2014) was a Pakistani religious leader.

Early life 

He studied at Chandka Medical College in 1976, and in 1984 he graduated with a degree of MBBS. He completed postgraduate studies in Islamic culture from Sachal Sarmast Oriental College Larkana, and completed his religious studies from the International Islamic University, Islamabad International Islamic University Islamabad, with distinction. Soomro obtained a degree from Al-Azhar University, Egypt, where he was a student of Gad al-Haq, the university Vice-Chancellor.

Career
His father belonged to an Islamic and Political Party called Jamiat Ulama-e-Islam Pakistan. in 1988, his political career started when he was chosen as Secretary General in Jamiat-ulmae-Islam [Sindh]. On several occasions, he was a candidate for the Provincial and National Assembly.

He served as Senator of JUI-F from Sindh in Senate of Pakistan.

Soomro set up a welfare organization called Al Mehmood Social Welfare Organization Pakistan.

Death
He was assassinated in Sukkur on 29 November 2014, at age 55. His funeral procession was attended by thousands of people.

Bibliography
K̲h̲ālid Maḥmūdu Joṇo, Shahīd-i Islām: ʻAllāmah Dạ̄kṭar K̲h̲ālid Maḥmūd Sūmro jī ḥālāta, k̲h̲ayālāta, afkār ain siyāsī, samājī k̲h̲idmatun tay tafṣīlī kitāb, Lārkāna: Maktabah-yi Abū K̲h̲ālid Shahīdu, 2018, 304 p. Essays on his life and political struggle.

See also

 List of Senators of Pakistan
Jamiat Ulema-e-Pakistan (Assembly of Pakistan 'Ulama)

References

External links

Sindhi people
People from Larkana District
Al-Azhar University alumni
Jamiat Ulema-e-Islam (F) politicians
1959 births
2014 deaths